P-type may refer to:

 P-type asteroid, type of asteroid
 P-type semiconductor
 MG P-type, a type of automobile
 P-type ATPase, evolutionarily related ion and lipid pumps
 P-Type (rapper), a South Korean rapper